Thomas Finn (born 16 February 1934 – 21 May 2021) was a professional rugby league footballer who played in the 1950s and 1960s.

Playing career

Hull FC
Tommy Finn made his debut for Hull FC in December 1954

Challenge Cup Final appearances
He played , and scored a try in Hull FC's 13-30 defeat by Wigan in the 1958–59 Challenge Cup Final during the 1958–59 season at Wembley Stadium, London on Saturday 9 May 1959, in front of a crowd of 79,811, and played  in the 5-38 defeat by Wakefield Trinity in the 1959–60 Challenge Cup Final during the 1959–60 season at Wembley Stadium, London on Saturday 14 May 1960, in front of a crowd of 79,773.

References

External links
Search for "Finn" at rugbyleagueproject.org
Search for "Tommy Finn" at britishnewspaperarchive.co.uk
Search for "Thomas Finn" at britishnewspaperarchive.co.uk

1934 births
2021 deaths
English rugby league players
Hull F.C. players
Rugby league halfbacks
Rugby league players from St Helens, Merseyside
St Helens R.F.C. players